Gumbel or Gumble is a surname. Notable people with the surname include:

 Bryant Gumbel (born 1948), American television sportscaster, brother of Greg
 David Heinz Gumbel (1906–1992), Israeli designer and silversmith
 Emil Julius Gumbel (1891–1966), German mathematician, pacifist and anti-Nazi campaigner
creator of Gumbel distribution
 Greg Gumbel (born 1946), American television sportscaster, brother of Bryant
 Nicky Gumbel (born 1955), Anglican priest and author
 Thomas Gumble (died 1676), English biographer
 Wilhelm Theodor Gumbel (1812–1858), German bryologist
 Wilhelm von Gumbel (1823–1898), German geologist

Fictional
 Barney Gumble, a fictional character from The Simpsons